Anolis altae, the high anole, is a species of lizard in the family Dactyloidae. The species is found in Costa Rica.

References

Anoles
Reptiles of Costa Rica
Endemic fauna of Costa Rica
Reptiles described in 1930
Taxa named by Emmett Reid Dunn